Ahmadullah Alizai (born 1972) is a politician in Afghanistan who serves as a ministerial advisor to the President. He has worked as Governor of Badghis and Governor of Kabul Province. He previously served as the Deputy Governor of Kabul Province, Deputy Governor of Nangarhar Province, and as Director of Counter-Narcotic directorate for the south-west zone.

Biography

Early life
Alizai was born on 1972 in the Maruf District of Kandahar Province in southern Afghanistan. He is an ethnic Pashtun from the Alizai tribe of southern Afghanistan. He comes from an educated, influential and political family. His father was an elder of the Alizai tribe who played a vital role during the Soviet–Afghan War.

During the Soviet war, he migrated to Pakistan and gained primary education in Pishin, Balochistan. He graduated from high school in 1989. He earned his B.A degree in 1997 and M.A degree in 1999, both in political science.

Career
During 1995, he established a non-governmental organization (NGO) in order to serve Afghans in Pakistan.

Alizai was appointed as the General Director for the ARDP for five years. He became the director of the Counter Narcotics Police of Afghanistan stationed in the south-west zone for three years right after he left the organization in 2001. 

Alizai started his other job as the director for the general directorate of Counter-Narcotic at East zone, from 2005 to 2008. He was then appointed to assist the central government and government strategies, and was assigned to work as the deputy governor for the east Nangarhar provincial government office for one ending in 2008 but due to the needs and repeated asks of the central government he got an assignment as the deputy governor for the Kabul government office, where he could be more helpful to the government and the people of Afghanistan. He was the deputy governor in Kabul Province for three years starting from 2008. Currently, Alizai is the acting governor of Kabul Province since April 2011 after Zabihullah Mojaddidy resigned.

References

1972 births
People from Kandahar Province
Pashtun people
Living people
Governors of Kabul Province